The 1985–86 season was the 62nd season in the existence of AEK Athens F.C. and the 27th consecutive season in the top flight of Greek football. They competed in the Alpha Ethniki, the Greek Cup and the UEFA Cup. The season began on 8 September 1985 and finished on 23 June 1986.

Overview

In the summer of 1985, AEK "moved" to the Athens Olympic Stadium due to construction works at the AEK Stadium. Both Olympiacos and Panathinaikos already used the same stadium as their home ground at the time, with the resulted for the first time that competitive obligations were also introduced on Saturdays, so that all 3 teams can be served competitively. Antonis Georgiadis left the team's bench for Olympiacos, while Zafeiropoulos hired Jacek Gmoch, who had won the 1984 double and he had reached the semi-finals of the European Cup with Panathinaikos. Christos Ardizoglou left the club to end his career at Apollon Athens, a team where he started his career, since for various reasons he failed to transfer to Olympiacos. In December, both Vangelis Vlachos and Lysandros Georgamlis left for Panathinaikos and greatly affected the team's later performance in the league. In the transfer period of December, AEK was strengthened with the addition of Greek-Australian expatriate, Jim Patikas.

AEK started the league with two convincing victories against PAOK and Aris, but the continuation was not proportional. The whole season was a year of successive ups and downs in the performance of the team, which could not acquire duration and rhythm. The club presented two different faces in their struggles at home and away matches. While at home they finished undefeated, but with 7 draws that knocked them out of the title race, at the away matches they gathered 7 defeats in 15 games. The team finished at the third place where they were tied with Iraklis, 7 points behind the champion Panathinaikos and 2 behind the second OFI. In the UEFA Cup, AEK were eliminated by the mighty Real Madrid, who were the eventual winners, in the first round, despite winning the first leg at Athens. In the Cup, AEK reached the semi-finals where they were eliminated by Panathinaikos in a margin. Top scorer at the league was Håkan Sandberg with 12 goals and Márton Esterházy in total with 17 goals, while Theologis Papadopoulos had a very good season. One of the few positives of that season was that AEK achieved an average league ticket record in their history with 31,254 tickets per game.

However, the whole season was accompanied by the court thriller that was reserved for the end. AEK were playing in the penultimate matchday in Serres against Panserraikos. ΑΕΚ wanted the victory to stay on track for a ticket to the next season's UEFA Cup. On April 19, at the eve of the match, the general manager of AEK, Giannis Chrysovitsianos, was arrested on the accusation that he tried to bribe the players of Panserraikos, Michalis Galatidis, Giorgos Sfakianakis and Giannis Antoniadis, through Giorgos Rigas, to underperform the game. The match took place normally with Panserraikos winning by 2–0, a result that eventually did not help him avoid relegation. The result of this whole story was that the league standings were not secured, until the case was finalized. Eventually, that happened in mid-June, with AEK being punished with the deduction of 3 points, but from the next season's championship. Thus, the organizing authority decided to conduct a third place play-off match between AEK and Iraklis. Iraklis considered the decision of the punishment of AEK for next year, as well as the acquittal of OFI for the double doping of the football player Isis, as a scandal. The play-off match was set for June 23 at Volos. The delay of the conduction of the match resulted in Esterházy playing in the match, having first participated with his country's national team at the FIFA World Cup in Mexico. The team from Thessaloniki, which disagreed with the condition of the play-off match because they considered themselves wronged by the non-punishment of AEK for the current season and were forced to show up only for not to be punished and tried to imitate the match. Iraklis' squad was consisted of only 10 players since according to their management, the rest of the players were on vacation. At the 53rd minute and while the match is at 0–0, Iraklis were left with 6 players after Zifkas and Karaiskos were sent off while Santexis and Adamou left injured. According to the regulation, the referee interrupted the match and was awarded 2–0 to AEK, which won the European ticket.

Players

Squad information

NOTE: The players are the ones that have been announced by the AEK Athens' press release. No edits should be made unless a player arrival or exit is announced. Updated 30 June 1986, 23:59 UTC+3.

Transfers

In

Summer

Winter

Out

Summer

Winter

Notes

 a.  During the previous season, Vlachos was at the end of his five year contract and Zafeiropoulos proposed a relatively small offer for a contract renewal. Vlachos had also an offer from Vardinogiannis, to move to Panathinaikos which he accepted. At 26 April 1985, he filed an appeal to EEODEP, asking for debts from AEK and making use of his five-year term, asked to be released from the club so he could play for Panathinaikos. It was the beginning of a court series that lasted several months, which resulted in Vlachos playing for Panathinaikos, but only after his contract with AEK had expired.

Loan out

Summer

Renewals

Overall transfer activity

Expenditure
Summer:  ₯0

Winter:  ₯0

Total:  ₯0

Income
Summer:  ₯0

Winter:  ₯0

Total:  ₯0

Net Totals
Summer:  ₯0

Winter:  ₯0

Total:  ₯0

Pre-season and friendlies

Alpha Ethniki

League table

Results summary

Results by Matchday

Fixtures

3rd place play-off

Greek Cup

Matches

Round of 32

Round of 16

Quarter-finals

Semi-finals

UEFA Cup

First round

Statistics

Squad statistics

! colspan="11" style="background:#FFDE00; text-align:center" | Goalkeepers
|-

! colspan="11" style="background:#FFDE00; color:black; text-align:center;"| Defenders
|-

! colspan="11" style="background:#FFDE00; color:black; text-align:center;"| Midfielders
|-

! colspan="11" style="background:#FFDE00; color:black; text-align:center;"| Forwards
|-

! colspan="11" style="background:#FFDE00; color:black; text-align:center;"| Left during Winter Transfer Window
|-

|}

Disciplinary record

|-
! colspan="17" style="background:#FFDE00; text-align:center" | Goalkeepers

|-
! colspan="17" style="background:#FFDE00; color:black; text-align:center;"| Defenders

|-
! colspan="17" style="background:#FFDE00; color:black; text-align:center;"| Midfielders

|-
! colspan="17" style="background:#FFDE00; color:black; text-align:center;"| Forwards

|-
! colspan="17" style="background:#FFDE00; color:black; text-align:center;"| Left during Winter Transfer Window

|}

References

External links
AEK Athens F.C. Official Website

AEK Athens F.C. seasons
AEK Athens